Norway was represented by Kirsti Sparboe, with the song "Dukkemann", at the Eurovision Song Contest 1967, which took place on 8 April in Vienna. "Dukkemann" was chosen as the Norwegian entry at the Melodi Grand Prix on 25 February. This was the second of Sparboe's three Eurovision appearances for Norway.

Final
The MGP was held at Centralteatret in Oslo, hosted by Jan Voigt. Ten performers and five songs took part in the final with each song sung twice by different singers, once with a small combo and once with a full orchestra. The winning song was chosen by voting from ten regional juries.

At Eurovision 
On the night of the final Sparboe performed 13th in the running order, following Spain and preceding Monaco. Each national jury had 10 points to distribute between the songs, and at the close "Dukkemann" had picked up 2 points (1 each from the Netherlands and Sweden), placing Norway joint 14th (with Austria and the Netherlands) of the 17 entries. The Norwegian jury awarded 7 of its 10 points to contest winners the United Kingdom.

Voting

References

External links 
Full national final on nrk.no

1967
Countries in the Eurovision Song Contest 1967
1967
Eurovision
Eurovision